Sylvanus Dung Dung (born January 27, 1949) is a former field hockey player from Simdega, Jharkhand, India. Received the Dhyanchand award in 2016.

References
Sylvanus Dung Dung's profile at databaseOlympics
"Hockey Olympic Gold Medallist Living in Poverty"

External links
 

1949 births
Living people
People from Simdega district
Field hockey players from Jharkhand
Olympic field hockey players of India
Olympic gold medalists for India
Olympic medalists in field hockey
Indian male field hockey players
Medalists at the 1980 Summer Olympics
Recipients of the Dhyan Chand Award
Asian Games medalists in field hockey
Field hockey players at the 1978 Asian Games
Asian Games silver medalists for India
Medalists at the 1978 Asian Games
Field hockey players at the 1980 Summer Olympics